Max Tannone, formerly known as Minty Fresh Beats, is a New York music producer most notable for his production of mashup music.

Early life and career
Born in Manhattan, Max lived in Upstate New York for most of his life, until he moved back to New York City in 2008. He began making beats and remixes with FL Studio (formerly Fruity Loops) at age 16. Currently, Max uses FL Studio, Acid Pro, and Adobe Audition. Some of Max's musical influences include the Beastie Boys, DJ Premier, Beck, and King Tubby. Later on, he calls groups like A Tribe Called Quest, Black Star and The Roots to his most influenced groups.

In December 2008, Max digitally released Jaydiohead, a mash-up album combining Jay-Z and Radiohead. Jaydiohead was Max's first full length mash-up project. Five additional Jaydiohead tracks were released in July 2009. In September 2009, Max digitally released Doublecheck Your Head, which mixed Beastie Boys vocals over instrumental tracks the band recorded for their 'Check Your Head' disc. Max's third mash-up project, Mos Dub was digitally released in April 2010. Max is briefly featured in the Jaydiohead "Ignorant Swan Medley" music video.

Max has described his creative process as finding "an acapella and a song I want to sample. Next I chop up the original song into short pieces so I can re-arrange it, and from here I build the track around the vocals. Once the skeleton is completed, I began adding drums, FX, other instruments, edit the vocals, etc. Really just making it as you go."

Discography
Jaydiohead (2009)
Jaydiohead: The Encore (2009)
Doublecheck Your Head (2009)
Mos Dub (2010)
Dub Kweli (2010)
Selene (2011)
Ghostfunk (2011)
Mic Check 1234! (2012)
Champagne Jerry − For Real, You Guys (2013)
Champagne Jerry − The Champagne Room (2016)
Champagne Jerry − I've Grown (2018)
Trading WAV Sound System (2020)
NNNNYYYY (2021)

References

External links
Official site of Max Tannone

Musicians from New York City
Living people
Year of birth missing (living people)
People from Manhattan
FL Studio users